The Mini Electric (marketed as the Mini Cooper SE in all markets outside the United Kingdom) is a battery electric version of the third generation Mini Hatch that was launched in 2020. The drivetrain utilises technology developed for the earlier BMW i3.

Design 
The battery uses twelve packs of lithium-ion cells arranged in a T-shape between the front seats and below the rear seats.

Compared to the Mini E, a limited production battery-electric vehicle leased by Mini to a few hundred customers in the United States in 2008, the acceleration, power, and range were nearly the same, but the battery in the newer Mini Electric takes up less passenger volume; the battery of the Mini E occupied the entire rear seat and cargo area.

The chassis was fitted with unique dampers; springs were borrowed from the Countryman and Clubman models to accommodate the extra weight of the battery, which increased weight by  compared to a base Cooper.

The Mini Electric has a luggage capacity ranging between 211–731 litres, depending on how many seats are used.

Styling 

Because the car does not require a radiator, the grille is closed; additional tweaks to the undercarriage and rear apron were made to reduce aerodynamic drag. Certain badges and trim of the Mini Electric are finished in a bright "Energetic Yellow" colour, which may be specified in grey instead. Inside the car, the digital instrument display, shifter, and starter button are highlighted with the same yellow colour. The charging inlet is located behind the fuel filler door and is regionalised: Type 2/CCS Combo 2 in Europe and Type 1/CCS Combo 1 in North America.

One of the model-specific wheel options, initially branded "Corona Spoke", has a three-hole asymmetric design reminiscent of three-pin BS 1363 household mains sockets in the United Kingdom; the name was updated to "Power Spoke" shortly after the COVID-19 pandemic began. The Mini Electric continues to use the round stylised "E"/plug logo first developed for the Mini E and continued on the Countryman Cooper S E Hybrid.

A facelifted version of the Mini Cooper was unveiled in 2021, reducing the use of bright yellow trim and badges.

History 
The Mini Electric should not be confused with the 2010 Mini E which was a limited production vehicle used as a technology and market test platform.

The Mini Electric was previewed by a concept car, the Mini Electric Concept at the 2017 Frankfurt IAA. The production Mini Cooper SE was announced in July 2019 and the international launch was held six months later in Miami, where BMW touted the fleet of press cars would be charged using renewable sources of energy.

The Mini Electric is assembled at Plant Oxford alongside conventionally-powered Mini hatchbacks. At launch, the factory could build up to 120 Mini Electric vehicles per day, and already had 2,000 preorders for the UK market. The corresponding trim levels and prices in the US were "Signature", "Signature Plus", and "Iconic". In 2020 17,580 Cooper SE were sold worldwide.

The "MINI Electric Pacesetter inspired by JCW" was unveiled in March 2021; it functioned as the safety car for the 2020–21 Formula E World Championship.

In 2021, Paul Smith designed the MINI STRIP, a version of the Mini Electric which shows sustainable ideas, for example a panoramic roof and car mats by remanufactured materials as well as cork in the interior.

Reception 
In 2021, the UK magazine CAR noted "the ride is firm ... the Mini fidgets and fusses more than we'd like; ... [the steering] tugs about lumpily under heavy acceleration and there's a surprising dead spot on the straight and narrow", noting the Mini "is largely indistinguishable from its combustion-engined compatriots" but "you can get the same range for less, more range for a similar price or a generally far more interesting car" from competitors on the British market. Motor Trend echoed CAR: "I can't recommend the Cooper SE ... It is not the confidence-inspiring electric hot hatch I had anticipated. Instead, it's a style-over-substance, disappointing glimpse at how great an electric Mini could be."

In a three-way comparison test with the Honda e and Peugeot e-208 conducted by CAR in 2020, the Mini Electric finished third. The reviewer noted the Mini was "comfortably the quickest car here  but what surprised us more was how it lacked the sophistication of the others" and called the range "desperately short".

In contrast, the US magazine Car and Driver said that if "you don't need to drive 200 miles on a charge and ... you enjoy driving ... this might be the best electric way to get you there." Technology site CNET compared the Cooper SE with the Mazda MX-30 in 2021, noting that while the interior dimensions and driving range were comparable, "the MX-30 is unpleasant to use and dull to drive. Every time one of us gets into the Cooper SE, it makes us happy. The Mazda, on the other hand, feels like a bore."

Competitors 
 Honda e
 Hyundai Ioniq
 Mazda MX-30
 Nissan Leaf
 Peugeot e-208
 Renault Zoe

References

External links 

 
 
 
 

Cars introduced in 2019
Mini (BMW) vehicles
Production electric cars
Subcompact cars
Retro-style automobiles